Nathaniel W. Milliken was a member of the Wisconsin State Assembly.

Biography
Milliken was born on May 13, 1834 in Strong, Maine. He died on October 16, 1892.

Career
Milliken was a member of the Assembly in 1882 as an Independent Republican. Additionally, he was Chairman of the Town Board (similar to city council), Town Treasurer and Postmaster of Saxeville, Wisconsin and Sheriff and County Treasurer of Waushara County, Wisconsin.

References

External links

People from Strong, Maine
People from Waushara County, Wisconsin
Members of the Wisconsin State Assembly
Wisconsin city council members
City and town treasurers in the United States
Wisconsin sheriffs
Wisconsin postmasters
Wisconsin Republicans
Wisconsin Independents
1834 births
1892 deaths
Burials in Wisconsin
19th-century American politicians